La Meyze is a commune in the Haute-Vienne department in the Nouvelle-Aquitaine region in west-central France. La Meyze station has rail connections to Brive-la-Gaillarde and Limoges.

Inhabitants are known as Meyzais.

See also
Communes of the Haute-Vienne department

References

Communes of Haute-Vienne